Pseudodeltaspis is a genus of beetles in the family Cerambycidae, containing the following species:

 Pseudodeltaspis carolinae Audureau, 2008
 Pseudodeltaspis cyanea Linsley, 1935
 Pseudodeltaspis punctipennis Chemsak & Hovore, in Eya, 2010

References

Trachyderini
Cerambycidae genera